Cawy Bottling Company is a soda beverage company founded in Cuba in 1948 and nationalized after the Cuban Revolution when communists took over in 1959. Two of the company's executives emigrated to the U.S. and restarted the brand in 1962, first offering lemon-lime soda and then diversifying outside of that competitive market by offering Materva (a yerba mate flavored soda) and then other tropical flavors.

Products
Cawy's soda brands include lemon-lime soda, Materva, Jupiña, Champ's Cola and Quinabeer. Jupiña is the company's best-selling line. Other offerings from the company include Cawy Watermelon, Coco Solo (a coconut soda), Fruti Cola (a red cola), Malta Cawy (a Malta (soft drink)), Trimalta, Rica Malt Tonic, and Rica Orange Mandarin. An article in Spin (magazine) described the watermelon soda as "horrible tasting", adding that it is "a perfect example of why certain flavors just weren't meant to be carbonated."

Jupiña 
Jupiña (pronounced hoo-peen-yah) is a sweet pineapple flavored carbonated beverage. The name is from a condensed version of "Jugo de Piña" (juice of pineapple).

Quinabeer
Quinabeer is a carbonated beverage produced by Cawy Bottling Company. It is very sweet with hints of orange and cherry flavor.  It has been described as tasting like a combination of cream soda and cola. Another source says it is "like root beer, but sweeter".

Quinabeer cans feature a stylized drawing of a bicep flexing "Champion George Prince". The same figure also adorns Cawy's Champ's Cola, a lighter version of Quinabeer.

Distribution
Cawy's beverages are distributed in the United States, Canada, Central America and Spain.

See also

Champagne soda
Ironbeer

References

Further reading
Cuban immigrant started Cawy Bottling in Miami by Carli Teproff March 19, 2011 Miami Herald

External links

Drink companies of the United States
Companies based in Miami
Food and drink companies established in 1948
1948 establishments in Cuba
Food and drink companies based in Florida